The Dame in Colour is a 1985 Canadian drama film directed by Claude Jutra. It was entered into the 14th Moscow International Film Festival.

Plot 
La Dame en couleurs is set in an insane asylum administered by nuns. Into this harsh place is dumped a truckload of children who soon find an entrance to a long-forgotten underground passage beneath the hospital. There, free from the strict control of the nuns, the children can let their imaginations run free, creating a mystical world of primitive mysteries and cult-like rites.

Cast
 Paule Baillargeon as Sister Gertrude
 Ginette Boivin as Soeur Ste-Anne
 Lisette Dufour as Françoise
 Ariane Frédérique as Gisele
 Charlotte Laurier as Agnes Laberge
 Guillaume Lemay-Thivierge as Ti-Cul
 Jean-François Lesage as Ti-Loup
 Gregory Lussier as Denis Tremblay
 François Méthé as Sebastien
 Gilles Renaud
 Mario Spenard as Regis

References

External links
 

1985 films
1985 drama films
Canadian drama films
Films directed by Claude Jutra
French-language Canadian films
1980s Canadian films